David Mackey (born July 24, 1966 in New Westminster, British Columbia and raised in Richmond, British Columbia) is a retired National Hockey League player.

He played parts of six seasons for the Chicago Blackhawks, Minnesota North Stars, and St. Louis Blues. He had 8 goals, 12 assists, and 20 points in 126 games.

Career statistics

References

External links
 

1966 births
Canadian ice hockey left wingers
Chicago Blackhawks draft picks
Chicago Blackhawks players
Ice hockey people from British Columbia
Living people
Minnesota North Stars players
People from New Westminster
People from Richmond, British Columbia
St. Louis Blues players